Mohammed Hussein Al-Ashwal is a Yemeni Wushu martial artist. He was born on 20 October 1983 in Muharraq, Bahrain.  He won bronze medals in the men's 48 kg sanshou category at both the 2003 and 2005 World Wushu championships.

International achievements 
 2003: the Bronze Medalist in the 7th World Wushu Championships Macau, China
 2004: the Silver Medalist of the 2nd Sanshou World Cup, Guanzhou, China 
 2004:the Bronze Medalist in the 6th Asian Wushu Championships, Yangon, Myanmar (Burma) 
 2005 Gold Medalist in the 3rd Arab Wushu Championships, Amman, Jordan 
 2005: Bronze Medalist in the 8th World Wushu Championships Hanoi, Vietnam 
 2006 the Bronze Medalist in the 3rd Sanshou World Cup, Shi'an, China 
 2008: Gold Medalist in the 2nd Arab Wushu Championships for Clubs, Jordan, Aman 
 2008: the Bronze Medalist in the 7th Asian Wushu Championships, Macau, China. 
 2010: the Gold Medalist in the 1st International Championships in Taikwanjitsu, Amman, Jordan.

References 
 https://www.youtube.com/watch?v=8kSwRpRGg2E&t=33s
 https://forum.kooora.com/?t=13734175
 https://althawra-news.net/news83566.html
 https://www.youtube.com/watch?v=YQwXXsQ1bbY

Website and social Media account 
 https://www.facebook.com/mohammed.h.alashwal/

References

Living people
Yemeni sanshou practitioners
Wushu practitioners at the 2006 Asian Games
Year of birth missing (living people)
Asian Games competitors for Yemen

http://www.iwuf.org/wp-content/uploads/2019/07/7th-World-Wushu-Championships-2003-Macau-China-Results.pdf